Pak Khlong Bang Pla Kot is a tambon (subdistrict) in Phra Samut Chedi District, Samut Prakan Province, central Thailand.

History
Pak Khlong Bang Pla Kot is the settlement located along the khlong (canal) of the same name that runs through the area. Pak Khlong Bang Pla Kot literally translates as "the mouth of the bagrid catfish canal". Khlong Bang Pla Kot is a canal on the right bank of the Chao Phraya River. Folks have used it as a thoroughfare since the past.

In the middle Ayutthaya period during the King Ekathotsarot's reign it was the site of a Dutch trading-post called "New Amsterdam". The story of New Amsterdam has been described in The History of Japan Together with a Description of the Kingdom of Siam, 1690-1692, the archives of Engelbert Kaempfer, a German physician who followed the Dutch diplomatic corps who came to develop good relations with the Ayutthaya in the early the King Phetracha's reign.

According to Kaempfer, the trading-post was located two leagues away from the river mouth. It as large bamboo building, the roof of which was used as a storage place for hides awaiting shipment.

The current location of New Amsterdam is believed to be in Soi Suk Sawat 55, off Highway 303 (Suk Sawat Road), the location of now AGC Chemicals (Thailand) Co., Ltd. (ACTH), without even leaving any debris.

Geography
The terrain is a lowland with the Chao Phraya River flowing through, affected by the flooding of the sea. The soil condition is saline soil, not suitable for cultivation.

Adjacent areas are (from the north clockwise): Lat Luang Town Municipality, Chao Phraya River, Laem Fa Pha Subdistrict Municipality, and Subdistrict Administrative Organization Nai Khlong Bang Pla Kot.

Administration
The entire area of the Pak Khlong Bang Pla Kot is governed by the Phra Samut Chedi Subdistrict Municipality (เทศบาลตำบลพระสมุทรเจดีย์).

It was also divided into four muban (village)

These four villages could also be divided into 15 communities.

Population
Pak Khlong Bang Pla Kot has a total population of 11,299 (5,552 men, 5,747 women) in 5,708 households.

Place

Temples
Wat Phra Samut Chedi
Wat Khae

Historical house
Phisuea Samut Fort

Education
Pomnakkarach Sawatyanon School

Hospital
Paolo Hospital Phrapradaeng

Government office
Phra Samut Chedi Police Station

Notes

External links
 
Tambon of Samut Prakan Province
Populated places on the Chao Phraya River
Historic districts in Thailand